Gerald Ferguson (January 29, 1937 – October 8, 2009) was a conceptual artist and painter who lived and taught in Halifax, Nova Scotia. Born in Cincinnati he was both a Canadian and US citizen.

Background
After receiving his MFA from Ohio University Ferguson taught at two institutions before coming to Canada in 1968, invited to teach at Nova Scotia College of Art and Design (NSCAD) in Halifax. He continued to teach at NSCAD until his retirement in 2006.

Work
During his time at NSCAD he developed his conceptual approach to painting, what the Dalhousie Art Gallery curator Susan Gibson Garvey refers to as "literal, task-oriented paintings." With NSCAD president Garry Neill Kennedy, Ferguson helped establish NSCAD as an important centre for conceptual art, noted for his role in the idea of "the dematerialization of the art object" in Lucy Lippard's influential history of conceptualism Six Years: The Dematerialization of the Art Object from 1966 to 1972. Critic Gary Michael Dault describes Ferguson's teaching at NSCAD as a "37-year trajectory...wherein he stubbornly, persuasively tilled the fields of the kind of conceptual art for which the college became primarily known."

His work is represented in numerous public and private collections in Canada, the US and Europe. Ferguson has had solo exhibitions at Dalhousie Art Gallery, Art Gallery of Ontario, Vancouver Art Gallery, Winnipeg Art Gallery and the National Gallery of Canada.

Ferguson has work in the collection of the National Gallery of Canada. Museum of Modern Art in New York and the Museum Sztuki, in Łódź, Poland. In 1972-73 he was a visiting professor at the California Institute of the Arts. His work has been regularly reviewed in national and international art journals and news media. In 1996, he was the recipient of 1995 Canada Council for the Arts Molson Prize. Ferguson retired from teaching in 2006. His estate is represented by Olga Korper Gallery in Toronto and CANADA in New York.

References

Further reading
 Ferguson, Gerald and Susan Gibson Garvey. Gerald Ferguson: Frottage Works 1994-2006 & Ash Can Paintings 2006. Halifax: Dalhousie Art Gallery, 2007. 
 Jenkner, Ingrid. Gerald Ferguson: 1,000,000 Grapes. Halifax: Art Gallery Mount Saint Vincent University, 1999. 
 Mahon, Patrick. Lines Painted in Early Spring: Gerald Ferguson, Ben Reeves, Carmen Ruschiensky, Francine Savard. Lethbridge: Southern Alberta Art Gallery, 2003. 
 Patten, James and Diana Nemiroff. Gerald Ferguson: Recent Paintings. Winnipeg: Winnipeg Art Gallery, 2002. 
 Spalding, Jeffrey. Aspects of Canadian Painting of the 70s. Calgary: Glenbow Museum, 1980.
 Young, Dennis. Gerald Ferguson, Paintings. Halifax and Toronto: Dalhousie Art Gallery and Art Gallery of Ontario, 1977.

External links
CANADA, NYC
Wynick/Tuck Gallery
CCCA Profile
ABC Artbooks

20th-century Canadian painters
Canadian male painters
21st-century Canadian painters
Canadian conceptual artists
1937 births
2009 deaths
Academic staff of NSCAD University
20th-century Canadian male artists
21st-century Canadian male artists